Bau Dham is a village 13 kilometers from Laxmangarh, Sikar district, India. Nuvanath Ji Maharaj's temple is in Bau Dham. The village population is 450 homes.

Siddhi Vinayak E-Service BAU Pin 332315

Villages in Sikar district

बऊधाम के संत  श्री रतिनाथ जी महाराज अब हमारे बिच नहीं रहे , उन्होंने आज सवेरे २३-१२-२०२२ गुरुवार को मुंबई में अंतिम सांस ली। भगवान उनकी आत्मा को चिर शांति प्रदान करे।